The British International Open 2019 (known as The Birds Eye British Championships for sponsorship reasons) was an  IWF bronze level weightlifting event hosted at the Ricoh Arena in Coventry on the 7-9 June 2019. The competition was a qualifier for the Tokyo 2020 Olympics and featured 71 athletes from over 20 nations.

Schedule
The following is the competition schedule for the British International Open competitions:

Start times as listed on the official schedule

Event summary

Host nation Great Britain won the most medals with 13 and recorded a 1-2 finish in the Woman's 64kg class with Zoe Smith edging out Sarah Davies by just a single kilogram. China topped the gold medal tally with a total of 3. Four-times World Champion Ilya Ilyin made his second international start since returning from suspension and took silver in the Men's 96kg class.  The group was won by Ukraine's Kyryl Pyrohov.  Ilyin's Kazakhstan compatriot Denis Ulanov won gold in the Men's 81kg class.

Medal table

Medalists

Men's events

Women's events

References

External links
 Results Book

 International weightlifting competitions hosted by the United Kingdom
British International Open